Brighouse High School (and Sixth Form) is an academy school in Brighouse, West Yorkshire, England.

Admissions
It has approximately 1,400 students. The school contains around 1,050 students while the Sixth form contains around 350 students. The school is a Business and Enterprise College, rated 'good' by Ofsted. Brighouse High School's Headteacher is Mr Richard Horsfield. The school also has two Deputy Headteachers. 
It is situated adjacent to Halifax Road (A644) in the Hove Edge area of north-west Brighouse.

History
The school began as Brighouse & District Girls' Secondary School on 6 September 1910 then became "Brighouse Girls' Grammar School" in 1944. In 1985, following reorganisation of education in Calderdale, it became Brighouse High School, a mixed comprehensive school.

It is now a comprehensive school with Academy status and educates students aged 11–18 years old.

The sixth form is separate from the main school in the former grammar school in the town centre on Halifax Road and recently the new Mulberry Suite has opened, which includes a cafeteria for students and new study rooms.

Academic performance

Notable alumni 
Notable former students of Brighouse High School have included actor Matthew Wolfenden, politician Holly Lynch, footballer Cameron Murray, and comedian Jack Carroll.

References

Academies in Calderdale
Educational institutions established in 1910
Brighouse
Secondary schools in Calderdale
1910 establishments in England